Vijay Thanigasalam  (born March 8, 1989) is a Canadian politician who has served as a member of Provincial Parliament since 2018, representing the riding of Scarborough—Rouge Park as a member of the Progressive Conservative (PC) Party.  He also serves as the Parliamentary Assistant to the Minister of Infrastructure. He is one of the first Tamil Canadians to be elected as a Member of the Provincial Parliament in Ontario.

Early life and education 
Born in 1989, Thanigasalam immigrated to Canada at the age of 14.  He attended St. Joan of Arc Catholic Academy (then known as Jean Vanier Catholic Secondary School) while working multiple part-time jobs.  At this time, he began to get involved and volunteer with many community organizations in Scarborough. He went on to study at the University of Toronto Scarborough and completed his Bachelor of Commerce in Finance at the Ontario Tech University.  After graduation, Thanigasalam worked as a financial advisor.

Political career 

On June 7, 2018, Thanigasalam was elected to the Legislative Assembly of Ontario as the Member of Provincial Parliament (MPP) for Scarborough—Rouge Park. In 2019, he was named Parliamentary Assistant to the Minister of Transportation.  In this capacity, Thanigasalam and his government announced the building of the Scarborough Subway Extension, which is currently under construction.

He also secured funding for the Tamil Community Centre within his riding of Scarborough—Rouge Park, which has the highest concentration of Tamil Canadians in Canada.

In 2022, Thanigasalam supported the provincial government’s $1 billion plan to revitalize the Scarborough Health Network’s aging infrastructure. The funding includes a new emergency department at Centenary Hospital and a complete redevelopment of the Birchmount Hospital.  Thanigasalam was also instrumental in announcing the Scarborough Academy of Medicine and Integrated Health (SAMIH) at the University of Toronto Scarborough, the first ever medical school in Scarborough. This is the largest expansion of an undergraduate and postgraduate medical school in Toronto since 1843.

Thanigasalam was re-elected in the 2022 Ontario general election and subsequently named Parliamentary Assistant to the Minister of Infrastructure.

Bill 104 - Tamil Genocide Education Week Act 
In 2019, Thanigasalam introduced Bill 104, Tamil Genocide Education Week Act, which proposed a seven-day period ending on May 18th (which marks the Mullivaikkal Remembrance Day) to be recognized as Tamil Genocide Education Week in Ontario.  The bill passed and received royal assent on May 12, 2021. The bill recognizes how Tamil-Ontarian families “have been physically or mentally traumatized by the genocide that the Sri Lankan state perpetrated against the Tamils during the civil war which lasted from 1983 to 2009, and especially so in May 2009".

Bill 104 is the first time that claims of the Tamil Genocide were officially recognized by a government in the Tamil diaspora. This was significant for the Tamil community in Canada and across the world.

Electoral record

References

1989 births
Living people
Canadian politicians of Sri Lankan descent
People from Scarborough, Toronto
Politicians from Toronto
Progressive Conservative Party of Ontario MPPs
Sri Lankan emigrants to Canada
21st-century Canadian politicians
Canadian people of Sri Lankan Tamil descent